Rebecca Jane Spicer (born 1980) is a female retired British sport shooter.

Sport shooting career
She represented England and won a bronze medal in the 10 metres air rifle, at the 1998 Commonwealth Games in Kuala Lumpur, Malaysia. Four years later she made a second Games appearance at the 2002 Commonwealth Games in Manchester. A third Games appearance in 2006 resulted in winning a gold medal in the 50 metres rifle 3 position pair with Louise Minett.

References

1980 births
Living people
British female sport shooters
Commonwealth Games medallists in shooting
Commonwealth Games gold medallists for England
Commonwealth Games bronze medallists for England
Shooters at the 1998 Commonwealth Games
Shooters at the 2002 Commonwealth Games
Shooters at the 2006 Commonwealth Games
20th-century British women
21st-century British women
Medallists at the 1998 Commonwealth Games
Medallists at the 2006 Commonwealth Games